Asif Mohmmed is an Indian cell biologist, parasitologist and a professor at the International Centre for Genetic Engineering and Biotechnology (ICGEB), New Delhi. At ICGEB, he leads a research group on Parasite Cell Biology and is one of the key collaborators of the Tewari Lab at the School of Life Science of the University of Nottingham. He is known for his studies on Plasmodium falciparum proteases with regard to cellular Stress and parasite cell-death and protein-trafficking machinery in the pathogen, as well as the development of new anti-malarial drugs. His studies have been documented by way of a number of articles and ResearchGate, an online repository of scientific articles has listed 73 of them. The Department of Biotechnology of the Government of India awarded him the National Bioscience Award for Career Development, one of the highest Indian science awards, for his contributions to biosciences, in 2011.

Selected bibliography

See also 

 Malaria vaccine
 Antimalarial medication

References

External links 
 

N-BIOS Prize recipients
Indian scientific authors
Living people
Indian medical academics
Indian medical researchers
Scientists from Delhi
Indian cell biologists
Indian parasitologists
Year of birth missing (living people)